Saundarya Rajesh (born 1968) is an Indian social entrepreneur who is the founder and president of Avtar Group. She is known for introducing the concept of Second Career opportunities for women in corporate India. She runs an initiative, Project Puthri to empower underprivileged girls with employment. She was awarded the ‘100 Women Achievers of India’ in 2016 by the Minister of Women and Child Development for her work. She received the Women Transforming India Award from the NITI Aayog and the United Nations in 2016.
Her debut book, The 99 Day Diversity Challenge: Creating an Inclusive Workplace (2018), was published by SAGE Publishing.

Early life and education 
She holds a degree in English literature from Madras University and later pursued an MBA at the Pondicherry School of Management. In 2005, she received Chevening Scholarship, funded by the United Kingdom's Foreign and Commonwealth Office and was also selected by the US government for International Visitor Leadership Program (IVLP). Later, she completed her PhD in women's workforce participation.

Career 
Saundarya started her career with Citibank in 1990. She took a break from her career on becoming a mother. She later worked as a producer and compere for All India Radio and Doordarshan between 1992–95, after which she was a part-time lecturer at MOP Vaishnav College for Women in Chennai between 1996-2003.

In 2000, she founded her first venture Avtar Career Creators, later relaunched as Bruhat Insights Global, an AI-powered recruitment firm. In 2005, Saundarya launched Avtar I-Win to help women find a second career after a break. In 2008, Saundarya founded Avtar Human Capital Trust, a not-for-profit organization working towards economic empowerment of women. She founded Flexi Careers India in 2011.

She runs an initiative called Project Puthri, which aims to create Career Intentionality among underprivileged girl students between the age group 13 to 18. Another initiative she runs is MITR (Men Impacting Trust & Respect),  which educates and empowers boys from classes IX to XII to become inclusive and empathetic towards females.

In 2019, she gave a TEDx talk on the topic of Second Careers for Women – Re-innervating an important resource,  in which she emphasizes the importance of women’s participation in the Indian workforce through a series of anecdotes and research.

Awards and recognition 
She was awarded the ‘100 Women Achievers of India’ in 2016 by the President of India. In 2016, NITI Aayog, the public policy think tank and the United Nations gave her a "Women Transforming India award". In March 2019, on the occasion of International Women's Day, Saundarya was awarded the WebWonderWomen Award by the Ministry of Women and Child Development in collaboration with Twitter India. The award was presented by Maneka Gandhi, the Union Minister of Women and Child Development.

She has received many other awards such as:
 2019: Winds of Change Award in the individual category conferred by The Forum on Workplace Inclusion, University of St. Thomas, Minnesota, USA
 2019: Selected in the list of 35 Chevening Changemakers by the UK-government-funded Chevening Scholarship
 2019: Chennai Carnatic Women Empowerment Award by the Rotary Club of Chennai Carnatic.
 2014: Naturals Extraordinary Woman Award on the International Women's Day.
 2012: FICCI FLO Woman Entrepreneur of the year award for building and creating India’s first women’s careers service.
 2011: TiE Stree Shakti, entrepreneur of the year award.
 2011:  India Today'''s Business Wizards Award
 2011: The CavinKare Chinnikrishnan Innovation Awards
 2007: The Yuvashakthi Woman Entrepreneur Award
 2006: The Standard Chartered SCOPE Woman Exemplar Award

 Personal life 
She is married to V. Rajesh, whom she met at business school. They have two children, a son and a daughter. She resides in Chennai, India.

 See also 
 List of Indian businesswomen

 References 

 External links 
 An Interview with Saundarya Rajesh at NDTV How one woman's experience of trying to re-enter the workforce changed the face of the HR industry in India at Vogue India Where the world is her family at Deccan Herald''

1968 births
Businesswomen from Puducherry
Living people
Businesspeople from Puducherry
University of Madras alumni
Indian social entrepreneurs
Indian company founders
Indian women company founders